Chase Through the Night is a 1984 Australian film about a gang of bank robbers on the run. It was a five-part, 30-minute teleseries.

References

External links

Australian crime drama films
1980s English-language films
1984 films
1984 crime drama films
Films directed by Howard Rubie
1980s Australian films